Murmania is a genus of sea slugs, aeolid nudibranchs, marine gastropod molluscs in the family Tergipedidae.

Species within the genus Murmania include:
 Murmania antiqua Martynov, 2006

References 

Tergipedidae